The Paris Peace Treaties were signed on 10 February 1947 following the end of World War II in 1945.
The Paris Peace Conference lasted from 29 July until 15 October 1946. The victorious wartime Allied powers (principally the United Kingdom, Soviet Union, United States and France) negotiated the details of peace treaties with those former Axis powers, namely Italy, Romania, Hungary, Bulgaria, and Finland, which had switched sides and declared war on Germany during WWII. They were allowed to fully resume their responsibilities as sovereign states in international affairs and to qualify for membership in the United Nations.

The settlement elaborated in the peace treaties included payment of war reparations, commitment to minority rights, and territorial adjustments including the end of the Italian colonial empire in North Africa, East Africa, Yugoslavia, Greece, and Albania, as well as changes to the Italian–Yugoslav, Hungarian–Czechoslovak, Soviet–Romanian, Hungarian–Romanian, French–Italian, and Soviet–Finnish borders. The treaties also obliged the various states to hand over accused war criminals to the Allied powers for war crimes trials.

Political clauses
The political clauses stipulated that the signatory should "take all measures necessary to secure to all persons under (its) jurisdiction, without distinction as to race, sex, language or religion, the enjoyment of human rights and of the fundamental freedoms, including freedom of expression, of press and publication, of religious worship, of political opinion and of public meeting."

No penalties were to be visited on nationals because of wartime partisanship for the Allies. Each government undertook measures to prevent the resurgence of fascist organizations or any others "whether political, military or semi-military, whose purpose it is to deprive the people of their democratic rights".

Border changes

Italy

Italy lost the colonies of Italian Libya and Italian East Africa. The latter consisted of Italian Ethiopia, Italian Eritrea, and Italian Somaliland. Italy continued to govern the former Italian Somaliland as a UN trust territory until 1960. In the peace treaty, Italy recognized the independence of Albania (in personal union with the Italian monarchy after the Italian invasion of Albania in April 1939). Italy also lost its concession in Tianjin, which was turned over to China, and the Dodecanese Islands in the Aegean Sea were ceded to Greece.

Italy lost Istria: the provinces of Fiume, Zara, and most of Gorizia and Pola were ceded to Yugoslavia; the rest of Istria and the province of Trieste formed a new sovereign State (Free Territory of Trieste) divided in two administrative zones under a provisional government for which the United Nations Security Council was responsible. In 1954, Italy incorporated the Province of Trieste (Zone A) and Yugoslavia incorporated the rest of Istria (Zone B). This was officially recognized with the Treaty of Osimo in 1975.

The villages of the Tende valley and La Brigue were ceded to France but Italian diplomats were able to maintain in place the Treaty of Turin (1860), according to which the French-Italian alpine border passes through the summit of Mont Blanc, despite French designs on the Aosta Valley. The French Republic has never made provision for the Italian language in the ceded formerly Italian towns of Briga and Tenda, effectively opting for a policy of linguistic assimilation. The province of South Tyrol was also kept by Italy despite the territorial demands of Austria, largely thanks to the Gruber–De Gasperi Agreement signed some months before.

Finland

Finland was restored to its borders of 1 January 1941 (thus confirming its territorial losses after the Winter War of 1939-1940), except for the former province of Petsamo, which was ceded to the Soviet Union. In Finland, the reparations and the dictated border adjustment were perceived as a major injustice and a betrayal by the Western powers, after the sympathy Finland had received from the West during the Soviet-initiated Winter War. However, this sympathy had been eroded by Finland's collaboration with Nazi Germany between 1941 and 1944. During this time, Finland not only recaptured territory it had lost in 1940, but continued its offensive deeper into Soviet lands, occupying a broad strip of Soviet territory. This prompted the United Kingdom to declare war on Finland in December 1941, further weakening political support in the West for the country. The Soviet Union's accessions of Finnish territory was based on the Moscow Armistice signed in Moscow on 19 September 1944 and resulted in an extension of the accessions in the Moscow Peace Treaty that ended the Winter War.

Hungary
Hungary was restored to its borders before 1938. This meant restoring the southern border with Yugoslavia, as well as declaring the First and Second Vienna Awards null and void, cancelling Hungary's gains from Czechoslovakia and Romania. Furthermore, three villages (namely Horvátjárfalu, Oroszvár, and Dunacsún) situated south of Bratislava were also transferred to Czechoslovakia, in order to form the so-called "Bratislava bridgehead".

Romania
Romania was restored to its borders of 1 January 1941, with the exception of the border with Hungary giving Northern Transylvania back to Romania. This confirmed the 1940 loss of Bessarabia and Northern Bukovina to the Soviet Union and the Treaty of Craiova, which returned Southern Dobruja to Bulgaria.

Bulgaria
Bulgaria was restored to its borders of 1 January 1941, returning Vardar Macedonia to Yugoslavia and Eastern Macedonia and Western Thrace to Greece, but keeping Southern Dobruja per the Treaty of Craiova, leaving Bulgaria as the only former Axis power to keep territory that was gained during the Second World War.

War reparations
The war reparation problem proved to be one of the most difficult arising from post-war conditions. The Soviet Union, the country most heavily ravaged by the war, felt entitled to the maximum amounts possible, with the exception of Bulgaria, which was perceived as being the most sympathetic of the former enemy states. (Bulgaria was part of the Axis but did not declare war on the Soviet Union). In the cases of Romania and Hungary, the reparation terms as set forth in their armistices were relatively high and were not revised.

War reparations at 1938 prices, in United States dollar amounts:
$360,000,000 from Italy:
$125,000,000 to Yugoslavia;
$105,000,000 to Greece;
$100,000,000 to the Soviet Union;
$25,000,000 to Ethiopia;
$5,000,000 to Albania.
$300,000,000 Finnish war reparations to the Soviet Union
$300,000,000 from Hungary:
$200,000,000 to the Soviet Union;
$100,000,000 to Czechoslovakia and Yugoslavia.
$300,000,000 from Romania to the Soviet Union;
$70,000,000 from Bulgaria:
$45,000,000 to Greece;
$25,000,000 to Yugoslavia.

Aftermath
The dissolution of the Soviet Union and Yugoslavia in the early 1990s did not lead to any renegotiation of the Paris Peace Treaties. However, in 1990 Finland unilaterally cancelled the restrictions the treaty had placed on its military.

See also

Aftermath of World War II
Allied Commission
Potsdam Agreement (1945, regarding Germany)
Moscow Conference (1945)
Treaty of San Francisco (1951, regarding Japan)
Treaty on the Final Settlement with Respect to Germany (1990)
Soviet occupation of Romania
World War II reparations towards Yugoslavia

References

External links
 
United States Department of State Foreign relations of the United States, 1946. Paris Peace Conference Proceedings
United States Department of State Foreign relations of the United States, 1946. Paris Peace Conference Documents
United Nations Treaty Series volume 49 (Full text of the treaties as registered at the United Nations. French, English and Russian texts are authentic).
 "Paris-WWII Peace Conference-1946: Settling Romania's Western Frontiers", at the Honorary Consulate of Romania in Boston, has pictures of the Romanian delegation
International Paris Peace Conference (1946) Records at the United Nations Archives

Aftermath of World War II
1947 in Finland
1947 in Bulgaria
1947 in Romania
1947 in Italy
1947 in the Soviet Union
Bulgaria–Soviet Union relations
Finland–Soviet Union relations
Hungary–Soviet Union relations
Italy–Soviet Union relations
Italy–United States relations
Italy–Yugoslavia relations
Romania–Soviet Union relations
Paris, 1947
Paris, 1947
Peace treaties of France
Peace treaties of Hungary
Paris, 1947
Paris, 1947
Paris, 1947
Peace treaties of the United Kingdom
Peace treaties of the United States
Treaties concluded in 1947
Treaties entered into force in 1947
Treaties of the French Fourth Republic
Treaties of Italy
Treaties of the Kingdom of Romania
Treaties of the People's Republic of Bulgaria
Treaties of Yugoslavia
World War II treaties
1947 in Paris
United Kingdom in World War II
February 1947 events in Europe